Cristiano Lopes Figueiredo (born February 18, 1978) is a Brazilian footballer who played in the 2010–11 Indonesia Super League. He played in Indonesia between 2003 and 2011.

References
 
 Profile in Liga Indonesia Official Website

1978 births
Living people
Footballers from Rio de Janeiro (city)
Brazilian footballers
Expatriate footballers in Indonesia
Liga 1 (Indonesia) players
Brazilian Christians
Expatriate footballers in Thailand
Expatriate footballers in Malaysia
Sri Pahang FC players
Malaysia Super League players
Persita Tangerang players
Persim Maros players
PSPS Pekanbaru players
PSIS Semarang players
Deltras F.C. players
Persikabo Bogor players
Pelita Bandung Raya players
Cristiano Lopes
Cristiano Lopes
Cristiano Lopes
Brazilian expatriates in Indonesia
Brazilian expatriates in Malaysia
Brazilian expatriate sportspeople in Thailand
Association football forwards